Oberreichenbach is a municipality in the district of Calw in Baden-Württemberg, Germany.

History
The village of Würzbach also became a possession of Württemberg when it acquired Zavelstein Castle in the early 14th century. When these districts were dissolved in 1938, Oberreichenbach, Oberkollbach, Igelsloch, and Würzbach were all assigned to Landkreis Calw. With the exception of Oberkollbach, which grew substantially in the 1960s and 1970s, there was not much development in the modern municipal area after World War II. In 1974, Oberkollbach and Igelsloch were merged into Oberreichenbach to form a new municipality that was further expanded on 1 January 1975 with Würzbach.

Geography
The municipality (Gemeinde) of Oberreichenbach is situated in the district of Calw, in Baden-Württemberg, one of the 16 States of the Federal Republic of Germany. Oberreichenbach is physically located on the plateaus and in the valleys of the Enz and Nagold. Roughly half of its municipal area is in the Grinde to the west, while the other half is in the Black Forest to the east. Elevation above sea level in the municipal area ranges from a high of  Normalnull (NN) to a low of  NN.

Portions of the Federally protected  and  nature reserves are located in Oberreichenbach's municipal area.

Politics
Oberreichenbach has four boroughs (Ortsteile), Igelsloch, Oberkollbach, Obrerreichenbach, and Würzbach, and four villages: Kunstmühle, Naislach, Siehdichfür, Unterkollbach. In addition, the minor administrative unit of Eberspiel and the abandoned village of Oberwürzbach are found in the municipal area.

Coat of arms
Oberreichenbach's municipal coat of arms shows four green fir trees rooted to a field of yellow, above a blue, wavy fess and a checkboard pattern of five red squares and five yellow squares at the base of the blazon. This pattern is largely a combination of the coats of arms of Oberkollbach and Würzbach, as Oberreichenbach did not actually have a coat of arms. The wavy fess is a reference to the names Oberreichenbach, Oberkollbach, Würzbach, and Unterkollbach, as bach means "stream" in German. The four trees reference the Black Forest and references the name Igelsloch, derived from "loh", an old German word for "forest". The checkerboard pattern is taken from the arms of the Lords of Zavelstein. The municipal coat of arms was approved by the Calw district office on 5 September 1983.

Transportation

References

External links

  (in German)

Calw (district)
Württemberg